Sazhino is a rural locality (a village) in Novoselskoye Rural Settlement, Kovrovsky District, Vladimir Oblast, Russia. The population was 8 as of 2010.

Geography 
Sazhino is located 60 km southwest of Kovrov (the district's administrative centre) by road. Rusino is the nearest rural locality.

References 

Rural localities in Kovrovsky District